Forks in the Road Schoolhouse is a historic one-room school building located at South Gilboa in Schoharie County, New York. It is a one-story, rectangular, gable roofed, timber-framed building built in 1849.  It operated as a school into the 1930s.  Also on the property is a privy.

It was listed on the National Register of Historic Places in 2005.

References

One-room schoolhouses in New York (state)
Schoolhouses in the United States
School buildings on the National Register of Historic Places in New York (state)
School buildings completed in 1849
Buildings and structures in Schoharie County, New York
1849 establishments in New York (state)
National Register of Historic Places in Schoharie County, New York